The Hausdorff medal is a mathematical prize awarded every two years by the European Set Theory Society. The award recognises the work considered to have had the most impact within set theory among all articles published in the previous five years. The award is named after the German mathematician Felix Hausdorff (1868–1942).

Winners 
2013: Hugh Woodin for his articles "Suitable extender models I" (J. Math. Log. 10 (2010), no. 1–2, pp. 101–339) and "Suitable extender models II: beyond ω-huge" (J. Math. Log. 11 (2011), no. 2, pp. 115–436).
2015: Ronald Jensen and John R. Steel for their article " without the measurable" (The Journal of Symbolic Logic, Volume 78, Issue 3 (2013), pp. 708–734).
2017: Maryanthe Malliaris and Saharon Shelah for their article "General topology meets model theory, on 𝔭 and 𝔱" (Proc. Natl. Acad. Sci. USA 110 (2013), no. 33, 13300–13305).
2019: Itay Neeman for his work on "the new method of iterating forcing using side conditions and the tree property".

See also

 List of mathematics awards

References 
 

Mathematics awards
Set theory